The Donald E. Knuth Prize is a prize for outstanding contributions to the foundations of computer science, named after the American computer scientist Donald E. Knuth.

History
The Knuth Prize has been awarded since 1996 and includes an award of US$5,000. The prize is awarded by ACM SIGACT and by IEEE Computer Society's Technical Committee on the Mathematical Foundations of Computing. Prizes are awarded in alternating years at the ACM Symposium on Theory of Computing and at the IEEE Symposium on Foundations of Computer Science, which are among the most prestigious conferences in theoretical computer science. The recipient of the Knuth Prize delivers a lecture at the conference.
For instance, David S. Johnson "used his Knuth Prize lecture to push for practical applications for algorithms."

In contrast with the Gödel Prize, which recognizes outstanding papers, the Knuth Prize is awarded to individuals for their overall impact in the field.

Winners
Since the prize was instituted in 1996, it has been awarded to the following individuals, with the citation for each award quoted (not always in full):

Selection Committees

See also
 List of computer science awards

References

External links
Knuth Prize website

Awards established in 1996
Theoretical computer science
Computer science awards
Donald Knuth
IEEE society and council awards
Association for Computing Machinery